Premam (transl. Love) is a 2015 Indian Malayalam-language coming of age romance film written, directed and edited by Alphonse Puthren. Produced by Anwar Rasheed, it features Nivin Pauly and Sai Pallavi in the prominent roles. The plot follows George (Nivin) and his friends from their teens to adulthood. While George's first love turns out to be a disappointment, Malar (Pallavi), a college lecturer, rekindles his love interest. His romantic journey takes him through several stages, helping him find his purpose. The film also features an ensemble supporting cast including Madonna Sebastian, Anupama Parameswaran, Shabareesh Varma, Krishna Sankar, Siju Wilson, Ananth Nag, Vinay Forrt, Soubin Shahir and others.

Produced on a budget of ₹4 crore, the film was a commercial success grossing ₹60 crore. The film was included in The Hindu's top 25 Malayalam movies of the decade and eventually attained a cult status. The film garnered awards and nominations in several categories, with particular praise for its direction, screenplay, Nivin and Pallavi's performance, music, cinematography, and editing. The film had a theatrical run of 175 days in Kerala and over 300 days in Tamil Nadu. The film was also remade in Telugu in 2016 with the same name.

At the 63rd Filmfare Awards South, Premam was nominated in seven categories, winning Best Female Debut (Sai Pallavi) and Best Male Playback Singer (Vijay Yesudas for "Malare"). At the 5th South Indian International Movie Awards, it received fifteen nominations and won seven, including Best Film, Best Director, Best Music Director, Best Lyricist, and Best Male Playback Singer (Vijay Yesudas). Nivin and Sai Pallavi won the Best Actor Critics and Best Debut Actress awards. At the 1st IIFA Utsavam, it received nine nominations and won four, including Best Performance in a Comic Role, Best Music Direction, Best Lyricist and Best Male Playback Singer. Among other wins, the film received six Asianet Film Awards, six Vanitha Film Awards, three Asianet Comedy Awards, four Asiavision Awards and two CPC Cine Awards. But the movie was not considered by the Kerala State Film Awards, the official state film award given by the Government of Kerala. Pallavi and Nivin's performances were ranked by Film Companion amongst the 100 Greatest Performances of the Decade.

Plot 
2000

George David, a 16-year-old pre-degree student, studies at Holy Spirit Convent College in Aluva, Kerala. He is infatuated with Mary, the prettiest school girl in the small village Uliyannoor-Thottakkattukara. George along with his friends, Shambu and Koya, often follows Mary around in an attempt to talk to her but he is afraid of her father, who beats up boys pestering his daughter. Mary is famous for her beauty and has other suitors too. 

Every time George gathers the courage to talk to Mary, something or the other comes up, and he ends up disappointed. George is heartbroken when he learns that Mary is in a relationship with another boy, also named George. She also asks for his help to date safely without her family knowing. He helps her with a painful heart. The seriousness of life finally sinks in when George, Shambu, and Koya introspect about their academic future after a dismal performance in their year-end examination.

2005

George and his friends get admission to Union Christian College, Aluva. One day, while on a ragging streak, George and his friends meet Malar, a new lecturer in their college who happens to have a Tamil background. George instantly falls for her and seemingly gets her to feel the same about him. He is also impressed by her dancing talents as she performs an outstanding routine with his team. Convinced about their love for each other, he extends their relationship and contemplates marriage. Simultaneously, George's college teacher, Vimal Sir, also falls for Malar and tries to woo her with the help of his friend, a PT teacher, Shivan.

Later that year, Malar goes to visit her family in Kodaikanal with her cousin, Arivazhagan, who by tradition is supposed to be her would be. Weeks later, it's announced in the college that Malar met with an accident and consequently left her job as the lecturer. George and his friends immediately ride to Kodaikanal to see Malar. It turns out Malar lost part of her memory due to the injuries suffered in the accident. She fails to recognize George and is not able to recall her relationship with him. As a result, Malar marries Arivazhagan and a heartbroken George attends her wedding reception with his friends.

2014

George, now 30, runs a café with his childhood friend Jojo. There, he meets 22-year-old Celine and feels an attraction towards her. He later realizes that she knew Mary and would walk with her, and they quickly become friends. Despite the age difference, George decides to propose to Celine. However, she is about to get engaged to a man named Roney Varghese, a cocaine addict. Roney continually insults Celine during their engagement, which results in their wedding being called off. Roney keeps calling and pestering Celine and this upsets George, who, with his friends, beats Roney up.

Finally, George marries Celine. During their wedding reception, Malar arrives with her husband, having been invited by Celine. Even though Malar had regained her memory, she did not reveal this to George as he was happy with Celine, and she needed to let things be the way they were.

Cast

Production

Development 
Following the success of the bilingual thriller Neram (2013), writer-director Alphonse Puthren planned for a Hindi remake for this project. But he decided to remake another film Shutter in Hindi, with Prithviraj Sukumaran being cast as the lead, despite reports stating that Anil Kapoor and Abhay Deol as the leads were surfaced. However, Alphonse eventually shelved the project and decided to work on a fresh script instead. He announced that the film will be titled as Premam, and as the title suggests, the film is said to be a romantic-drama. The project was bankrolled by director-producer Anwar Rasheed under his banner Anwar Rasheed Entertainment and Nivin Pauly was announced playing the lead role, which was his second project with Puthren in the studio album Yuvvh and Neram. The scripting process began during the same month. Rajesh Murugeshan who has previously composed music for Alphonse's Neram was roped as the music composer.

Casting 

In February 2014, Jude Anthany Joseph announced that he would play a cameo in the film, which will mark his acting debut. Though, the shooting of the film commenced without any leading lady for the film, the team announced that the film would feature three heroines playing the lead. Alphonse invited applications from Malayalam-speaking women between the ages of 16 and 25. Later they released an ad in September 2014 saying the film needed only two heroines and they must be aged between 15 and 22 and "both of them should be able to speak Malayalam and English fluently as well as have a very good smile". The same month, Vinay Forrt was announced playing a comic role in the film, and also joined the shoot during the filming.

Though the details of the female lead were not disclosed initially, it was later revealed that newcomers Anupama Parameswaran, Sai Pallavi and Madonna Sebastian were announced as the female leads. Madonna was initially a playback singer, trained under Carnatic and western music, had sung for composers Deepak Dev and Gopi Sundar. Alphonse initially approached Madonna at one of the television shows she hosted, whether he asked her to act in one of her films for which she agreed. Pallavi, a doctor-cum-dancer, was approached by Alphonse six years before, through clippings from a reality show which she had participated, showcased in Facebook. Alphonse initially gave her an offer to act in his film which she refused, and after six years, he phoned to Pallavi, in which she thought him as a stalker and wanted to lodge a police complaint on him. But later misunderstood after Alphonse forcibly introduced himself. In an interview, Alphonse revealed that Asin was initially considered for the character Malar, played by Pallavi, following a fan's request. The film introduced 17 new actors in the Malayalam film industry.

Filming 
Following the completion of pre-production, the principal photography began in July 2014. The team began filming the first schedule in Goa in August 2014, and returned to Kerala for filming major portions of the film. Major part of the film's shooting took place in locations in and around Aluva, with some scenes were filmed at Union Christian College, Fort Kochi, Chokkampatti Hills and Marthandavarma Bridge. The café which was run by George in the film was set at Pepper House restaurant in Fort Kochi. The entire filming was wrapped up in November 2014.

Music 

The original soundtrack and background score were composed by Rajesh Murugesan, who had collaborated with Puthren in the film Neram (2013). Shabareesh Varma, beside singing, wrote the lyrics for eight of the nine songs. One song "Rockaankuthu" which had lyrics written by Pradeep Palarr was sung by Tamil film composer Anirudh Ravichander. The soundtrack album was released by the record label Muzik 247 on 14 February 2015. All the audio songs released prior to the film release went viral on the internet. In March 2015, video for the song "Aluva Puzha" sung by Vineeth Sreenivasan was released and became the chart topper. "Malare" was released on YouTube on 6 June. The song received 1 million hits within 14 hours of release and trended on all social networking platforms. Apple Music selected it as the "Best Malayalam album" of 2015.

Release 
Premam was originally scheduled for a release on the occasion of Christmas (25 December 2014), however, following the post-production delays, the film was postponed to 13 February 2015, in order to coincide with the Valentine's Day weekend. Anwar Rasheed later confirmed that the film will be released within March 2015, although the film was later pushed to April. In the end, the producers announced that the film will be released on 28 May 2015 in Kerala, and the following day in India, clashing with another Nivin Pauly-starrer film Ivide and Tamil film Massu Engira Masilamani. International Business Times called it one of the most awaited film of the year.

A & A Release distributed the film in India, which opened in 85 screens in Kerala alone on 28 May and outside the state, it released the following day in Bangalore, Pune, Mumbai, Coimbatore, Gujarat, Hyderabad, Mysore, Vizag, Delhi, Mangalore, Manipal, Chennai and Goa. It became the first Malayalam film to be released in 43 screens in the UAE on 11 June. Great India Films distributed the film on 12 June in 25 locations in the United States. Indienwood distributed in the Europe, while Tricolor Entertainment released it on 11 June in Australia. Blue Planet Entertainment Ltd handled the release in the UK. Singapore Coliseum released the film in Singapore on 13 June.

Marketing 
The first look of Premam was unveiled on 24 January 2015, which featured a simple title logo designed in the shape of a butterfly. In a unique promotional activity, the film does not have a trailer release instead, two video songs were released as a part of the film promotions. According to Gokul Nath, the head of social media marketing company DigiFaktory, for which Premam became their first venture, he stated that "From the very beginning, I and Alphonse [Puthren] had a need for an element of suspense. The aim was to present the film as the story of a young lover-boy and nothing else. Alphonse had a clear vision about the film, he knew how he wanted the film to be projected, what about it would draw audiences to the theatre." However, a fan-edited trailer was released in November 2015.

Re-release 
After completing over 250 days theatrical run in Chennai box office, LA Cinema Maris in Trichy and Ram Muthuram Cinemas in Tirunelveli re-released the film on 18 March 2016. It is the first Malayalam film to have a re-release in Tamil Nadu. The film was further re-released in Chennai by Jazz Cinemas along with Vinnaithaandi Varuvaayaa and Raja Rani, for the occasion of Valentine's Day weekend for 10–16 February 2017. It was re-released again in Kerala on the occasion of Nivin Pauly's birthday (11 October 2019).

Piracy 
In June 2015, a pirated version of Premam appeared online. The copy had a watermark indicating that it was a "censor copy", or a copy intended for censor board officials to review prior to the film's release. The film's producer, Anwar Rasheed, threatened to resign from Film Producers Association citing their lack of action after the leak was discovered. The police arrested three teenagers in connection with the case, believing them to be involved with film piracy groups. Later, cinema theatre owners protested against the piracy issue by shutting down the theatres.

Reception

Critical response 

IB Times'''s reviewer Nicy V.P rated the film 5/5 and stated: "Premam is nothing but entertainment at its best and the movie deserves nothing less than a standing ovation." About the technicalities of the film, she said: "They are just flawless. From background score, songs, sound departments, art, cinematography, editing, costumes and others have come together to make Alphonse Putharen's dream a reality."
Veeyen of Nowrunning.com rated the movie 3.5 out of 5 and wrote: "'Premam' elevates Alphonse Puthren onto a pedestal of sharp film makers who have figured out the actual potential of the medium that cinema is. And in their competent hands long-standing tales assume ground-breaking forms and enthuse the viewers in ways and manners never seen before. Much more than an unabashed crowd-pleaser, which it surely is, 'Premam' is a bracingly alive film where almost everything, seems to have fallen right into place." Sify.com rated the film 3.5 in a scale of 5 and said, "Premam is all for some genuine fun and perhaps, a few nostalgic moments as well for 80's and 90's generation. It's a lengthy ride for sure, but it will leave you wanting for more". Paresh C Palicha of Rediff.com rated the film 3 in a scale of 5 and said, "With Premam, Alphonse Putheran proves that he has the knack of presenting themes that have blockbuster written all over." Aswin J Kumar of The Times of India rated the film 3.5/5 and said that Premam is a "movie with a high likeability quotient because it unearths the beauty in trifles." Litty Simon of Malayala Manorama rated 3 out of 5 stars and highly appreciated Alphonse Puthraren's direction, cinematography, music, lead performances, editing and humour. "The simple story is told with amazing visuals. It is humour at its best", "the director has rightly kept his word of expecting nothing big and aptly sticks with the tagline 'The second film in the history of world cinema with nothing fresh'", says the reviewer.

S. R. Praveen of The Hindu said, "Alphonse Puthren's understanding of the medium is evident and he does not appear to try hard at any point." He praised Putharen's script, saying, "The strong point of Alphonse's script is its humour, which is very organic and does not stick out as a separate track." Rejith RG of Kerala Kaumudi said, "Filled with unforgettable moments, characters and song sequences, Premam is a delight to watch. It's after a long time that we got to see such a hugely enjoyable Malayalam film." Mythily Ramachandran of Gulf News called it "A delightful entertainer with Nivin Pauly in the lead" and said, "Premam is a fun film, a simple love story of the boy next door, like its tagline that reads 'nothing extraordinary in it'." Pramod Thomas of The New Indian Express concluded his review saying, "'Premam' is a watchable flick for its realistic treatment of the plot, performance of the newcomers, wits, good songs and for Nivin Pauly."

 Box office 
According to trade analyst Sreedhar Pillai, the net collection in Kerala in 3 days is approximately 5.60 crore with a distributor share of 3.50 crore. But Rediff.com reported a 2.35 crore collection within the first four days. Sreedhar Pillai also reported  as the film's collection in Kerala alone within the first week of release, adding that it broke the previous records of Drishyam and Bangalore Days. However Gulf News reported, it collected  at the box office in the first week in India. P. V. Basheer also said that the film "would have earned a gross of about 5 crore in a week of its release in Kerala, with a distributor share close to 3 crore."

The earnings doubled in the second weekend from the first weekend. The gross collection from Kerala theatres crossed  in 14 day (June 12) of release. The film experienced a 90% to 100% theatre occupancy in the third weekend. In Ernakulam city the film grossed  in two weeks from Shenoys, Padma and Sridhar theatres. It grossed  in 25 days, which is a record in Malayalam film industry. In 50 days, the film collected over ₹60 crore from Worldwide box office of which ₹38 crore from Kerala, ₹7.5 crore from Rest of India, ₹2.6 crore from United States and United Kingdom combined and ₹11.5 crore from GCC box office.

The film was released on 12 June in 25 locations in the US distributed by Great India Films. The opening day gross was $26,000 and it raked up over $97,000 in three days in the Us. The US collection reached $106,000 in 4 days, giving tough competition to Bollywood and Tamil cinemas at the US. In two weeks, collection reached $150,000. The film collected $159,398 (₹1.01 crore) in second weekend from Australia.

In its final run, Premam film becomes the highest grossing Malayalam film in UAE-GCC territory by collecting ₹24 crore, in United States by collecting US$236,000 (₹1.76 crore) and also Rest of India box office at that time. The film collected ₹2 crore from Tamil Nadu box office in its 300 days theatrical run making it the highest grossing Malayalam film in Tamil Nadu at that time. The final box office collection is estimated as  worldwide. The film had theatrical run over 151 days in Kerala and 300 days in Tamil Nadu box office.

 Audience response The Hindu reported, "Youngsters are literally mobbing theaters, cash registers are ringing without non-stop, theater owners are being pressured into squeezing in an extra show, and even recommendations are being made for tickets. Due to its right timing in bringing the film onto the screens after a long dullness in the mollywood industry, this love-fantasy film is well accepted in the hearts of Malayalis. The movie seems well on the expressway to becoming a cult movie." P. V. Basheer Ahamed, president of the Kerala Film Exhibitors Federation, said that a similar euphoria was last seen when Mohanlal-starrer Narasimham hit theatres in 2000. Nivin Pauly and Sai Pallavi's performance was also appreciated by people inside the film industry.

In Apsara theatre in Kozhikode, a group of audience turned violent and vandalized after some minor technical snag disturbed the screening of the film. The violent mob went on a rampage within minutes and the screening was suspended. The screen was torn apart and chairs were destroyed in the melee. The ruckus continued even after the police reached the spot and resorted to lathi charge. A police officer was injured in the clash. Seven youngsters were taken into custody in connection with the incident.

At least 60 students of various local colleges were caught on Monday, 15 June, by the police for bunking classes to watch Premam. The police action was a part of Operation Gurukulam following complaints that students of various schools and colleges were skipping classes to watch the film. The demand for the tickets led Premam to be the film with maximum additional shows in theatres after Narasimham starring Mohanlal.

 Accolades 

 Remake Premam was remade into Telugu under the same name, which released in 2016. The film stars Naga Chaitanya and Shruthi Hassan in the lead role reprising Nivin and Pallavi and was directed by Chandoo Mondeti.

 Criticism 
In July 2015, reports have surfaced that Premam will be remade in Tamil, with Vijay Sethupathi and Hansika Motwani in the lead role reprising Nivin and Pallavi and Dhanush had bagged the remake rights. However, Dhanush had claimed that he did not have the rights for the film. In January 2016, fans of the original film trended the hashtag #SayNoToPremamTamil in the microblogging site Twitter, claiming that Tamil audience do not want to remake the film.

Fans started trolling Naga Chaitanya and Shruti Haasan after the release of the promo song "Evare" (a remake of the Malayalam original song "Malare"), for its Telugu remake claiming that it spoilt the flavour of the original song, and trended their reactions with hilarious memes. Many fans tagged Chaitanya and Shruti's performance as "overacting" and claimed that he and she failed to perfectly reprise Nivin and Pallavi's role from the original.

As the film did not receive a nomination at the Kerala State Film Awards, which is official state film award given by Government of Kerala, several comments were posted in social media expressing their disappointments. Director Aashiq Abu, slammed the jury committee for calling the filmmaking as "lazy" and expressed his displeasure on their decisions. Tamil filmmaker A. R. Murugadoss also expressed the same and called it as "unfair".

 Impact Premam opened to rave response from celebrities with prominent members from Tamil industry: notably Selvaraghavan, Shankar and Vijay lauding Pauly's performance and direction. The lead actresses in Premam, Sai Pallavi, Anupama Parameswaran and Madonna Sebastian became overnight celebrities and carved a niche for themselves in the South Indian film industry. Following the 2015 Kerala local elections, the song "Malare" was used as a part of their political campaign. The song "Malare" and one of its dialogues were featured in the most popular songs and dialogues of 2015 by The Times of India. Aluva, where the film was shot became a tourist hotspots with 5,000 visitors per month came within three months after its release. The black shirt and white mundu outfit worn by Nivin's character George and his gang during his college days became trending after the film's release and was sold by the textile stores in Kerala during Onam celebrations in colleges and schools.

 In Popular culture 
In the Tamil-language film Master'' (2021), the protagonist John Durairaj (Vijay), an alcoholic professor, quotes plots from films as the reason why he was addicted to alcoholism, thereby not revealing his backstory. He quoted the film's sub-plot of George's affair with Malar, as his backstory, in one of the scenes.

References

External links 
 
 

2015 films
2010s Malayalam-language films
2015 romantic drama films
Indian romantic drama films
Malayalam films remade in other languages
Films scored by Rajesh Murugesan
2010s musical films
Films set in universities and colleges
Films about educators
Indian coming-of-age drama films
Indian romantic musical films
Indian multilingual films
Films shot in Kochi
Films shot in Goa
Films directed by Alphonse Puthren